The 2018 FIFA World Cup OFC–CONMEBOL qualification play-off was a two-legged home-and-away tie between the winning team of the OFC Third Round, New Zealand, and the fifth-placed team from the CONMEBOL qualifying tournament, Peru.

The matches were played on 11 and 15 November 2017. Peru emerged victorious and qualified for the finals of the 2018 FIFA World Cup.

Overview
The play-off marked the third consecutive intercontinental play-off participation for New Zealand after previously losing to Mexico in 2013 and defeating Bahrain in 2009.

This was Peru's first participation in the inter-confederation play-offs. They previously qualified for the World Cup in 1982.

The draw for the order in which the two matches would be played was held by FIFA on 25 July 2015 at the World Cup Preliminary Draw.

First leg

Second leg

References

External links

Qualifiers, FIFA.com

World Cup play-off
4
World Cup play-off
FIFA World Cup qualification inter-confederation play-offs
International association football competitions hosted by New Zealand
International association football competitions hosted by Peru
New Zealand national football team matches
Peru national football team matches
November 2017 sports events in Oceania
November 2017 sports events in South America
2017–18 in New Zealand association football
2017 in Peruvian football
Peru at the 2018 FIFA World Cup